{{Infobox military unit
|unit_name= Marine Tactical Air Command Squadron 28
| image= MTATCS-28 insignia.GIF
|caption= MTACS-28 Insignia
|dates= 1 October 1947 – 18 November 2022
|country = 
|branch = 
|type=
|role= Aviation command & control
|size=
|command_structure= Marine Air Control Group 28 2nd Marine Aircraft Wing
|current_commander= LtCol. Kyle P. Hahn
|garrison= Marine Corps Air Station Cherry Point
|ceremonial_chief=
|colonel_of_the_regiment=
|nickname= Olympians
|patron=
|motto=
|colors=
|march=
|mascot=
|battles= Operation Desert Storm''Operation Enduring FreedomOperation Iraqi Freedom|anniversaries=
}}Marine Tactical Air Command Squadron 28''' (MTACS-28) was a United States Marine Corps aviation command and control unit based at Marine Corps Air Station Cherry Point. They provided the 2nd Marine Aircraft Wings tactical headquarters and commanded other units within Marine Air Control Group 28. The unit was deactivated on 18 November 2022 as part of reshaping the United States Marine Corps.

Mission
Provide equipment, maintenance, and operations for the Tactical Air Command Center (TACC) of the Aviation Combat Element (ACE), as a component of the Marine Air-Ground Task Force (MAGTF). Equip, man, operate, and maintain the Current Operations Section of the TACC. Provide and maintain a facility for the TACC Future Operations Section; and install and maintain Associated Automated Systems.

History
Activated 1 October 1947 at Marine Corps Air Station Cherry Point, North Carolina as Headquarters Squadron 2, 2d Marine Aircraft Wing, Fleet Marine Force. Elements participated in Operation Desert Shield and Operation Desert Storm, Southwest Asia, August 1990 – March 1991

Re-designated 1 May 1993 as Marine Tactical Air Command Squadron 28, Marine Air Control Group 28, 2nd Marine Aircraft Wing, Fleet Marine Force, Atlantic.

Detachments and Elements Participated in Operation Enduring Freedom, Operation Southern Watch, Operation Iraqi Freedom.

This unit was officially decommissioned on November 18, 2022 with a ceremony held at Miller’s Landing on MCAS Cherry Point.

Unit awards
A unit citation or commendation is an award bestowed upon an organization for the action cited. Members of the unit who participated in said actions are allowed to wear on their uniforms the awarded unit citation. MTACS-28 has been presented with the following awards:

See also

 United States Marine Corps Aviation
 Organization of the United States Marine Corps
 List of United States Marine Corps aviation support squadrons

Notes

References

 MTACS-28's official website.

Tacc28